"Love Song" is a song written and recorded by Canadian band Sky for their 1999 album Piece of Paradise. It was Sky's most successful single, climbing to number one on the Canadian RPM Top Singles chart. It also peaked at number 38 on the US Billboard Mainstream Top 40, becoming the band's only single to appear on any Billboard chart. Sky won a SOCAN Award for this song.

Music video 
Interspersed with the band playing the song the music video depicts James Renald wandering through a dimly lit, overcrowded house party. 

The music video was directed by Jef Renfroe.

Charts

Weekly charts

Year-end charts

References

1999 singles
Sky (Canadian band) songs
RPM Top Singles number-one singles
Songs written by James Renald
1999 songs
Arista Records singles